David or Dave Duncan may refer to:

Arts and entertainment
David Duncan (writer) (1913–1999), American screenwriter and novelist; wrote the screenplay for The Time Machine
David Douglas Duncan (1916–2018), American photographer
Dave Duncan (writer) (1933–2018), Scottish-Canadian fantasy and science fiction writer
David James Duncan (born 1952), American novelist, essayist, and fly-fisher

Sports
Davie Duncan (1921–1991), Scottish footballer
Dave Duncan (baseball) (born 1945), American Major League Baseball player and pitching coach
David Duncan (footballer) (born 1963), Ghanaian football player and manager
David Duncan (ski cross) (born 1982), Canadian ski cross racer

Others
David Duncan (minister) (1789–1829), Scottish Presbyterian minister
David Duncan (politician) (1830–1886), British merchant and Liberal politician
David Duncan (diplomat) (1923–2007), British diplomat
David F. Duncan (born 1947), American epidemiologist and expert on drug abuse
David Ewing Duncan (born 1958), American journalist
David Duncan (accountant) (born 1960), United States government's star witness in the Arthur Andersen trial
David Duncan (vintner) (born 1965), American vintner and entrepreneur

See also
David Duncan Main (1856–1934), British doctor